Phillip Barron is an American poet and philosopher who teaches at Lewis & Clark College in Portland, Oregon. His poetry has won the Nicolás Guillén Outstanding Book Award for philosophical literature and has been featured in many national journals including The Brooklyn Rail, New American Writing, and Janus Head: Journal of Interdisciplinary Studies in Literature, Continental Philosophy, Phenomenological Psychology, and the Arts. Barron also has a PhD in Philosophy from the University of Connecticut.

What Comes from a Thing has been described by reviewers as 
"a masterpiece of phenomenological description in which poetry is not application or a technique for profundity but instead at the heart of philosophical/poetic evocation" and as "laments of postindustrial despair, isolation, and ecological ruin." Through both poetry and philosophy, Barron challenges traditional conceptions of personal identity, reframing identity as a distributed phenomenon "that comes through the tension between the artificial and the untouched."

He was the founding editor of the poetry journal OccuPoetry, an online literary journal which documented poetry and art of the Occupy Movement. He is a member of the Community of Writers poetry workshop, and he edited the 2012 issue of the Squaw Valley Review.

Barron has been cited as an expert on sexism and capital punishment for a 2000 article titled "Gender Discrimination in the US Death Penalty System". In 2013, he appeared on a HuffPost Live segment on gender discrimination in the death penalty.

Awards and honors 
2019 Nicolás Guillén Outstanding Book Award
2015 Michael Rubin Book Award
2001-02 Davis-Putter Scholarship

Published Works

Poetry 
What Comes from a Thing (Fourteen Hills Press, 2015)

Prose 
The Outspokin' Cyclist (Avenida Books, 2011)

References

External links
 Phillip Barron: Official Website
 Fourteen Hills Press

Living people
Year of birth missing (living people)
21st-century American philosophers
21st-century American poets
American male poets
Poets from Oregon
Writers from Oregon
Philosophers from Oregon
21st-century American male writers
Lewis & Clark College faculty
San Francisco State University alumni
University of Massachusetts Amherst alumni
University of North Carolina at Chapel Hill alumni
Durham